Gerona, officially the Municipality of Gerona,  is a 1st class municipality in the province of Tarlac, Philippines. According to the 2020 census, it has a population of 94,485 people.

The MacArthur Highway goes through the center of the town.

Geography
Gerona is one of the 17 towns of the province of Tarlac. It is bounded on the north by Paniqui; on the east by the Pura; on the south by Tarlac City (the provincial capital); and on the west by Santa Ignacia.

The Tarlac River, which originates from the eastern slopes of the Zambales Mountains, cuts across the west central areas, dividing the town into two parts.

The eastern area consists of 31 barangays with total land area of  representing 63.9% of the total area. It is characterized as plain, low-lying agricultural land.

The second part is the Western Area consisting of 13 barangays with total area of  representing 36.03% of the total land area. It is characterized by hilly and rugged agricultural land and is also forested.

Barangays 
Gerona is politically subdivided into 44 barangays.

 Abagon
 Amacalan
 Apsayan
 Ayson
 Bawa
 Buenlag
 Bularit
 Calayaan
 Carbonel
 Cardona
 Caturay
 Danzo
 Dicolor
 Don Basilio
 Luna
 Mabini
 Magaspac
 Malayep
 Matapitap
 Matayuncab
 New Salem
 Oloybuaya
 Padapada
 Parsolingan
 Pinasling (Pinasung)
 Plastado
 Poblacion 1
 Poblacion 2
 Poblacion 3
 Quezon
 Rizal
 Salapungan
 San Agustin
 San Antonio
 San Bartolome
 San Jose
 Santa Lucia
 Santiago
 Sembrano
 Singat
 Sulipa
 Tagumbao
 Tangcaran
 Villa Paz

Climate

Demographics

Economy

Points of interest
1894 Saint Catherine of Alexandria Church of Gerona (Vicariate of St. Catherine of Alexandria, Vicar Forane: Father Alfredo Dizon, Titular: Saint Catherine of Alexandria, Feast day, November 24 Parish Priest: Father Alfredo Dizon, succeeded by Fr. Ramon Capuno Parochial Vicar: Rev. Fr. Paulo Dela Cruz - Don Federico Bartolome Street, McArthur Highway, Gerona, Tarlac 2302, Philippines under the Roman Catholic Diocese of Tarlac Roman Catholic Diocese of Tarlac led by Most Rev. Florentino F. Cinense, D.D., PhD, STL.

Gallery

References

External links

Gerona Profile at PhilAtlas.com

[ Philippine Standard Geographic Code]
Philippine Census Information

Municipalities of Tarlac